The Superfine Dandelion was an American psychedelic rock band from Phoenix, Arizona. They released one studio album, The Superfine Dandelion, in 1967 before they disbanded in 1968.

Career 
The Superfine Dandelion was founded in 1967 by Mike McFadden, a member of the Mile Ends, a further Phoenix garage rock band. This included bassist Ed Black and later Rick Anderson, the bassist for the Tubes. Mike Collins was the band's drummer. The group was influenced by Buffalo Springfield, the Lovin' Spoonful, and Jefferson Airplane.

The Superfine Dandelion were signed onto Mainstream Records in 1967 where they released their first and only album, The Superfine Dandelion. The album flopped on the charts, and the group disbanded in 1968.

Aftermath 
Ed Black and Mike McFadden went on to work with the Goose Creek Symphony and Linda Ronstadt. Anderson went on to work with the Tubes.

References 

1967 establishments in Arizona
Mainstream Records artists
Musical groups established in 1967
Musical groups disestablished in 1968
Musical groups from Phoenix, Arizona
American psychedelic rock music groups
1968 disestablishments in Arizona
Rock music groups from Arizona